Cubeba may refer to:

Cubeb, Piper cubeba a plant in genus Piper
West African Pepper, Piper guineense another plant in genus Piper
Litsea cubeba, May Chang a plant in genus Litsea